Paola Dionisotti (born 1946) is an Italian-British actress active on stage and British television since 1975.

A character actress best known on television for recurring roles as Lady Patricia Broughall in Forever Green and Aunt Nicholls in Harbour Lights, she also has had prominent roles in Miss Marple and Midsomer Murders. She is also known for playing Lady Waynwood in the HBO fantasy series Game of Thrones. On the stage, she is noted for her Shakespearean roles. She starred in Michael Bogdanov's 1978 Royal Shakespeare Company production of The Taming of the Shrew at the Aldwych. In 2014, she played the tavern landlady Mistress Quickly in the RSC production of Henry IV Parts One and Two.

Partial filmography

Awards
2000: London Evening Standard Theatre Award for Best Actress for Further Than The Furthest Thing at the Royal National Theatre

Notes

1946 births
Living people
British television actresses
British Shakespearean actresses
British stage actresses
Italian stage actresses
Italian television actresses
20th-century Italian actresses
21st-century Italian actresses
20th-century British actresses
21st-century British actresses
Italian emigrants to the United Kingdom